Ruben Madol Arol Kachuol is a South Sudanese politician. He is the former deputy chief justice and is the current Minister of Justice and constitutional affairs in the new reformed Cabinet of South Sudan.

He was appointed to that position on Friday March 13, 2020.

Education and Early life 
Ruben Madol Arol Kachuol born on 22 October 1952 in Cueibet. Ruben attended Rumbek Secondary School between 1968 and 1972. Ruben Madol Arol has a professional degree at the school of law at the University of Khartoum. Ruben Madol Arol had farming fields where he planted rice in Aweil; the rice was used to feed the people affected by the ongoing war at the time.

Career 
After graduating from the University of Khartoum, Ruben Madol Arol practiced law by working in local community courts to settle community disputes in Rumbek, Aweil and Warrap. After this Ruben was then appointed as the deputy chief justice of South Sudan and was later relieved of his duties at the judiciary. Ruben Madol Arol is now the current Minister of Justice and Constitutional Affairs in the cabinet of South Sudan.

See also
SPLM

References

University of Khartoum alumni
Sudan People's Liberation Movement politicians
1952 births
Living people